The 1st Independent Spirit Awards, honoring the best in independent filmmaking for 1985, were announced on March 22, 1986. The ceremony was hosted by Peter Coyote and Jeanne Lucas. It was held at 385 North, a restaurant in Los Angeles.

Winners and nominees

{| class="wikitable"
!Best Feature
!Best Director
|-
|After Hours

Blood Simple
Smooth Talk
The Trip to Bountiful
|Joel Coen – Blood Simple
Martin Scorsese – After Hours

Joyce Chopra – Smooth Talk
Peter Masterson – The Trip to Bountiful
|-
!Best Actor
!Best Actress
|-
|M. Emmet Walsh – Blood Simple

Rubén Blades – Crossover Dreams
Tom Bower – Wildrose
Treat Williams – Smooth Talk
|Geraldine Page – The Trip to Bountiful

Rosanna Arquette – After Hours
Laura Dern – Smooth Talk
Lori Singer – Trouble in Mind
|-
!Best Screenplay
!Best Cinematography
|-
|''The Trip to Bountiful – Horton FooteAfter Hours – Joseph Minion
Blood Simple – Joel Coen and Ethan Coen
Smooth Talk – Tom Cole
|Trouble in Mind – Toyomichi KuritaAfter Hours – Michael Ballhaus
Blood Simple – Barry Sonnenfeld
Dim Sum: A Little Bit of Heart – Michael Chin

|-
! colspan=2 | Best International Film
|-
| colspan=2 style="vertical-align:top;" |Kiss of the Spider WomanDreamchildThe HitRan''
|}

 Films with multiple nominations and awards 

 Special Distinction Award David Puttnam'''

See also
58th Academy Awards

References

External links
1985 Spirit Awards at IMDb
1st Independent Spirit Awards ceremony on YouTube
36 Years of Nominees and Winners at Film Independent

1985
Independent Spirit Awards